Victor Trevitt was a soldier, publisher, and legislator in the U.S. state of Oregon. He was born in New Hampshire in 1827 and lived in Ohio prior to enlisting for the Mexican War, in which he lost an eye. He was a publisher of the Salem Statesman and the Vox Populii, and later served as a member of the Oregon House of Representatives and the Oregon State Senate. He was a Mason.

He owned and operated a toll bridge over the Deschutes River, but sold it upon the successful launch of the Colonel Wright steamship. He died in 1883 after moving to San Francisco, and his dying wish was to be buried among the native people of Oregon, who he avowed to be more honorable than white people. His is the only grave marker on Memaloose Island in the Columbia River near Mosier, Oregon.

References

External links 
 Find-a-grave entry
 "Island of the Dead", Pacific Northwest Adventures blog (Oct. 2019)
 Biography at Historic The Dalles website, containing a thorough bibliography

Oregon state senators
Members of the Oregon House of Representatives
American military personnel of the Mexican–American War
Journalists from Oregon
1827 births
1883 deaths
19th-century American politicians